Amanita magnivelaris, commonly known as the great felt skirt destroying angel or the great feltskirt destroying angel amanita, is a highly toxic basidiomycete fungus, one of many in the genus Amanita. Originally described from Ithaca, New York, by Charles Horton Peck, it is found in New York state and southeastern Canada.

See also

List of Amanita species
List of deadly fungi

References

magnivelaris
Deadly fungi
Poisonous fungi
Fungi of North America
Fungi described in 1897
Taxa named by Charles Horton Peck